Tigers is a 2020 international co-produced sports drama film written and directed by Ronnie Sandahl and based on the autobiography I skuggan av San Siro by Martin Bengtsson. It was selected as the Swedish entry for the Best International Feature Film at the 94th Academy Awards.

Plot 
The movie surrounds the true story of teenage football talent Martin Bengtsson's (Erik Enge) time as a 16-year-old professional footballer at the Italian club Inter Milan.

Cast 

 Erik Enge
 Alfred Enoch
 Johannes Bah Kuhnke
 Liv Mjönes
 Frida Gustavsson
 Martina Oberti

Awards 

 Busan International Film Festival: Flash Forward: Best Film

Nominations 

 2020 Rome Film Fest: Best Director (Ronnie Sandahl)

See also
 List of submissions to the 94th Academy Awards for Best International Feature Film
 List of Swedish submissions for the Academy Award for Best International Feature Film

References

External links 
 

2020 films
2020s sports drama films
2020 drama films
2020s Swedish-language films
Swedish sports drama films
Italian sports drama films
Danish sports drama films
Films set in 2004